Annunciation is a 1570 work by El Greco, now in the Museo del Prado in Madrid. According to the art historian José Álvarez Lopera, it derives from an engraving by Jacopo Caraglio.

It is one of the major works produced during the painter's time in Venice, showing the influence of Titian in the figuration of Mary and Tintoretto in its composition, and may be a sketch or composition linked to the Modena Triptych.

Sources (in Spanish) 
 ÁLVAREZ LOPERA, José, El Greco, Madrid, Arlanza, 2005, Biblioteca «Descubrir el Arte», (colección «Grandes maestros»). .
 SCHOLZ-HÄNSEL, Michael, El Greco, Colonia, Taschen, 2003. .
ArteHistoria.com. «Anunciación» [Consulta: 19.12.2010].
Museo del Prado «La anunciación» [Consulta: 19.12.2010].

Paintings by El Greco in the Museo del Prado
1570s paintings